The Alaska Anchorage Seawolves men's ice hockey team is a National Collegiate Athletic Association (NCAA) Division I college ice hockey program that represents the University of Alaska Anchorage. The Seawolves were an original member of the now defunct men's division in the Western Collegiate Hockey Association (WCHA). They played at the Sullivan Arena in Anchorage, Alaska, and moved to the Seawolf Sports Complex on campus at the start of the 2019–20 season.

History
UAA began its ice hockey program in 1979, playing 8 of its 31 games against Division II Alaska–Fairbanks (winning all) before beginning a full D-II schedule the following season. The Seawolves rose quickly in the Division II ranks, narrowly missing out on the NCAA tournament in 1984 but promoted the team to Division I that summer when the entire D-II division collapsed.

Anchorage played as an independent for a year before being a founding member of the first west coast conference, the Great West Hockey Conference. The league was very short-lived, lasting only three seasons before the two non-Alaska schools dropped hockey entirely, but it did provide UAA with its first league title in 1987. The Seawolves were once again without a conference in 1988–89, but a year later they posted their first 20-win season at the D-I level and were selected to the NCAA Tournament.

The Seawolves dropped both games to Lake Superior State but returned the following year after another 20-win campaign and this time they were able to win their first NCAA round, defeating the Boston College Eagles. 1991–92 provided UAA with its best record, with the team going 27–8–1 and garnering a third consecutive NCAA berth (the last such for UAA as of 2019). After one more winning season the Seawolves joined the Western Collegiate Hockey Association.

The stability of their new conference came as a double-edged sword, however, as the Seawolves would spend the next 20 years finishing with losing records. To make matters worse the team would lose both games in the opening round of the WCHA tournament most of the time and only twice could manage a First Round series win.

The college hockey world changed in 2013 when the Central Collegiate Hockey Association collapsed due to the formation of the Big Ten and the National Collegiate Hockey Conference. This caused the WCHA to replace many of its departing members with weaker teams but even in the new WCHA UAA was still a bottom-half team. After making the conference semifinals the first season the Seawolves missed the playoffs each of the next five years.

In 2020, the university announced plans to cut the hockey program, along with skiing and gymnastics, due to sharp reductions in state funding. The University of Alaska Board of Regents offered the hockey team a chance at reinstatement in September if they could raise 2 seasons worth of expenses, approximately $3 million by February 2021, so the hockey program as a whole went on hiatus and did not compete for both the 2020-21 and 2021-22 seasons as its future was being determined. The fundraising was divided into 2 parts: $1.5 million in cash and the remainder in firm pledges. As of December 2020, the team began fundraising for the needed money. On August 31, 2021, the university announced that enough donations had been received to save the program. The team is expected to return for the 2022–23 season.

Season-by-season results

Head coaches

As of completion of 2022–23 season. Records includes regular season and playoffs games.

Statistical leaders

Career points leaders

Career goaltending leaders

GP = Games played; Min = Minutes played; W = Wins; L = Losses; T = Ties; GA = Goals against; SO = Shutouts; SV% = Save percentage; GAA = Goals against average

Minimum 30 games

Statistics current through the start of the 2018-19 season.

Roster
As of June 30, 2022.

Olympians
This is a list of Alaska Anchorage alumni were a part of an Olympic team.

Seawolves in the NHL
As of July 1, 2022.

Source:

References

External links
Alaska Anchorage Seawolves men's ice hockey

 
Ice hockey teams in Alaska